Lanix Internacional, S.A. de C.V. is a multinational computer and mobile phone manufacturer company based in Hermosillo, Mexico. Lanix primarily markets and sells its products in Mexico and the Latin American export market.

History

Lanix was founded in Hermosillo, Sonora, Mexico in 1990, and released its first computer, the PC 286 the same year.
 Throughout the 1990s Lanix expanded into the development and production of more sophisticated electronics components such as optical drives, servers, memory drives and flash memory. In 2002 Lanix opened its first factory outside of Mexico in Santiago, Chile to cater to the South American market.

By 2006 Lanix had gained a market share of 5% of Mexico's electronics market and began diversifying its product line to include LCD televisions and monitors and in 2007 began manufacturing mobile phones. Currently Lanix offers products in the consumer, professional and government markets throughout Latin America.
 
In 2010 Lanix announced an ambitious plan to gain market share in the Latin American computer market and expanded operations to include every country in Latin America

Lanix has production facilities at its original headquarters in Hermosillo, Sonora, Mexico and international facilities in Santiago, Chile and Bogota, Colombia.

At the 2009 Intel Solutions Summit hosted by Intel, Lanix won an award in the "mobile solution" category.

In March 2011, Lanix began offering a system where buyers can custom build their own computer, choosing different types of chipsets, memory, and other components.

In 2012 Lanix expanded its product portfolio by integrating its first Smartphone, Ilium S100, and positioned itself as one of the bestselling brands in the Mexican market.

In 2015 announces the first smartphone with Windows Phone of the company.

In June 2017 Lanix image is renewed by updating its logo, launching new high-end smartphones, and updating its webpage.

Products
, Lanix manufactures desktops, laptops, tablets, servers, netbooks, monitors, optical disc drives, smartphones flash memory and random-access memory.

As of 2010, it made one of the most powerful production Windows desktops in the world, the Lanix Titan Magnum Extreme.

Smartphones and tablet computers
In 2007, Lanix announced a mobile division specializing in developing smartphones and tablets. In 2010, it showed a smartphone named the Illium running the Android operating system. Lanix smartphones are offered by Telcel, a subsidiary of América Móvil.

In 2010, Lanix unveiled a tablet computer named the W10 running Windows 7. An Android version will be available through Telcel.

In 2017, Lanix announces its new portfolio of innovative smartphones with competitive features in the current market.

Mexican government contracts
Lanix has won several major contracts to provide electronics to government entities in Mexico which has been a key part of the company's success including a contract from the Mexican Secretariat of Public Education to supply 16,000 classrooms across Mexico with computers.

References

Mobile phone manufacturers
Electronics companies established in 1990
Consumer electronics brands
Computer companies of Mexico
Hermosillo
Mexican brands
Mexican companies established in 1990